Edwin Michael Reyno AFC, CD (11 May 1917 – 10 February 1982) was an Air Marshal in the Royal Canadian Air Force and a Lieutenant-General in the integrated Canadian Forces.

Biography
Born in Halifax, Nova Scotia, he graduated from Saint Mary's University with a Bachelor of Arts degree. Enlisting in the RCAF 3 January 1938, Reyno was deployed overseas with No.1 (C) Squadron. He served as both a fighter pilot and an instructor, and fought with distinction during the Battle of Britain.

After the war, Reyno attended RCAF Staff College in 1947 and Imperial Defence College in 1959. He served as the Director of Strategic Air Plans from 1952 until 1955, when he was promoted to Air Commodore and made the Air Officer Commanding at Air Defence Command. In 1963 he was promoted to Air Vice-Marshal and made Chief of Air Staff, 4th Allied Tactical Air Force. A final promotion to Air Marshal came in July 1966, when he was appointed Chief of Personnel of the Canadian Forces. From 1969 to 1972, he was the Deputy Commander of NORAD. He had three daughters, Nancy, Ruth, and Kathleen.  He died in 1982 of cancer.

References

|-
 

1917 births
1982 deaths
Royal Canadian Air Force air marshals
Canadian generals
Recipients of the Air Force Cross (United Kingdom)
The Few